The Nassau County Stakes is an American Thoroughbred horse race run annually at Belmont Park in Elmont, Nassau County, New York. A Grade III event, it is open to three-year-old fillies willing to run the distance of seven furlongs on dirt.  The race offers a purse $200,000 added. 

Inaugurated in 1996, it is named after the county on Long Island in which Belmont Park is located.

On November 28, 2007, this Grade II stakes race was downgraded to a Grade III by the American Graded Stakes Committee.

Previously, Belmont Park hosted the Nassau County Handicap, a race on dirt for horses of either sex, age three and older. This race was last run in 1993.

Records
Speed record:
 1:22.04 - Dream Rush (2007)

Most wins by a jockey:
 2 - Jorge Chavez (1996, 2008)
 2 - José A. Santos (1997, 2003)
 2 - Mike E. Smith (1998, 1999)
 2 - Javier Castellano (2002, 2009)

Most wins by a trainer:
 No trainer has won this race more than once.

Most wins by an owner:
 No owner has won this race more than once.

Winners

Nassau County Handicap
Open to horses of either sex, age three and older, it was raced on dirt over a distance of  miles (9 furlongs).

In 1992, the four-year-old Strike the Gold, set a new track record of 1:46 3/5 in winning the Nassau County Handicap.

Winners

1993 - West By West
1992 - Strike the Gold
1991 - Festin
1990 - Tricky Creek
1989 - Forever Silver
1988 - Personal Flag
1987 - Lac Ouimet
1986 - Roo Art
1985 - Secret Prince
1984 - Moro
1983 - Winter's Tale 
1982 - Princelet
1981 - Fool's Prayer
1980 - Winter's Tale
1979 - Alydar
1978 - Upper Nile
1977 - Forego
1976 - Forego
1975 - Queen City Lad
1974 - Timeless Moment
1973 - Icecapade
1972 - Towzie Tyke
1971 - Proliferation
1970 - Reviewer
1969 - Rixdal
1968 - Primo Richard
1967 - Handsome Boy
1966 - Pluck
1965 - Malicious
1964 - Garwol
1963 - Kelso
1962 - Beau Prince
1961 - Black Thumper
1960 - Polylad
1959 - Endine
1958 - Eddie Schmidt
1957 - Gallant Man
1956 - Admiral Vee

References

Graded stakes races in the United States
Flat horse races for three-year-old fillies
Horse races in New York (state)
Belmont Park
Recurring sporting events established in 1996
1996 establishments in New York (state)